Inspired by Guru's Jazzmatazz project, the German formation Jazzkantine was founded in 1993 in Braunschweig. Their first album Jazzkantine won them the "Echo Award" in 1996, the most important German music prize.

The music of Jazzkantine is a cross-over between jazz funk and hip hop music: German rap over music and beats heavily influenced by jazz standards, often interpreted in a very funky way. This genre is also known as jazz rap.

In 1998, they played at the Montreux Jazz Festival.

In 1999, they started a collaboration with the ballet ensemble of Braunschweig, resulting in the successful Tanzzkantine project.

Discography

References

External links
Jazzkantine

German musical groups
Musicians from Braunschweig
Musical groups established in 1993
1993 establishments in Germany